Code of the Rangers is a 1938 American Western film directed by Sam Newfield and written by Stanley Roberts. The film stars Tim McCoy, Rex Lease, Judith Ford, Wheeler Oakman, Edward Earle and Frank LaRue. The film was released on April 8, 1938, by Monogram Pictures.

Plot
Ranger Tim Strong resigns after finding out that his brother is gang member and broke a member of a gang from jail, later the gang robs the town bank and Tim goes after them, he finds his brother with the loot, but takes the blame for his brother. After being released he and his reformed brother go after the gang leader Blackie Miller.

Cast          
Tim McCoy as Tim Strong
Rex Lease as Jack Strong
Judith Ford as Anne Sage
Wheeler Oakman as Blackie Miller
Edward Earle as Price
Frank LaRue aa Dave Sage
Edward Peil Sr. as Ranger Captain 
Kit Guard as Red
Roger Williams as Lawson
Jack Ingram as Hank
Hal Price as Charlie Stevens
Budd Buster as Mine Agent 
Zeke Clemens as Yodeler

References

External links
 

1938 films
1930s English-language films
American Western (genre) films
1938 Western (genre) films
Monogram Pictures films
Films directed by Sam Newfield
American black-and-white films
1930s American films